Lake Nemiscau (in French: Lac Nemiscau) is a freshwater lake, located in the municipality of Eeyou Istchee James Bay, in the administrative region of Nord-du-Québec, in north-western Quebec, in Canada. The lake Nemiscau is crossed by Rupert River.

The abandoned settlement of Nemiscau is on the north shore, but in recent years, Cree people have been re-establishing Nemiscau as a summer residence.

Geography

Lake Nemiscau is crossed by Rupert River coming from South and also fed by Nemiscau River coming from East.

Toponymy

The designation "Nimisco Lake" appears on an old card entitled "Partie de la Nouvelle-France" (Part of New France), by Alexis Jaillot, Paris, 1685. The designation "Lake Nemisko" is on the "Map of Canada or New France and who Discoveries there have been made", by Guillaume Delisle, Paris, 1703. The spelling" Nemisco L. appears on the card entitled "A New and Exact map of the Dominions of the King of great Britain on the continent of North America", [London], in 1715, revised in 1732 or after.

The place name Lake Nemiscau was formalized on December 2, 1982, by the Commission de toponymie du Québec (English: Quebec Names Board).

See also 

 Rupert Bay
 James Bay

References

External links

Lakes of Nord-du-Québec
Cree